Silviu Bindea (24 October 1912 – 6 March 1992) was a Romanian football player and coach.

He represented Romania at the 1934 and 1938 World Cups as a forward, scoring twice in a first-round game in 1938.

Honours

Player
Ripensia Timișoara
Liga I (4): 1932–33, 1934–35, 1935–36, 1937–38
Cupa României (2): 1933–34, 1935–36

References

External links

1912 births
1992 deaths
Romanian footballers
Victoria Cluj players
FC Ripensia Timișoara players
CAM Timișoara players
CFR Turnu Severin players
FC CFR Timișoara players
Liga I players
1934 FIFA World Cup players
1938 FIFA World Cup players
Romania international footballers
People from Blaj
People from the Kingdom of Hungary
Association football forwards